Ioannis Charalambopoulos (February 10, 1919 – October 16, 2014) was a Greek Army officer (Colonel of the Engineering Corps) and socialist politician who served as Minister of Foreign Affairs and Minister of National Defence of Greece.

Early life and political career
Charalambopoulos was born in 1919 in Psari, Messenia, to a military family. He studied at the Hellenic Army Academy and completed his studies with a scholarship at Woolwich Polytechnic after World War II. During the war, he served as the commander of an infantry unit during the Greco-Italian War and later in the Mediterranean and Middle East Theatre. He left the army in 1963 with the rank of Colonel and became a politician in the Center Union, being elected to Parliament representing Messenia in the 1963 and 1964 elections.

During the Greek military junta of 1967–1974, Charalambopoulos founded the Democratic National Resistance Movement, and spent three years in internal exile for his opposition to the regime. After the fall of the dictatorship in 1974, Charalambopoulos became a founding member of the Panhellenic Socialist Movement, and was elected to Parliament on its lists in all elections from 1974 to 2000, representing the Athens B constituency.

After the accession of Greece to the EEC on January 1, 1981, he became a provisional member of the European Parliament representing Greece until the country could hold its first European Parliament elections in October. On October 21, 1981, he was appointed Minister of Foreign Affairs in the first cabinet of Andreas Papandreou and served in the position until July 26, 1985. He was then appointed Deputy Prime Minister of Greece during Papandreou's second term until 18 November 1988, in addition receiving the portfolio of National Defence on 25 April 1986 which he held until 2 July 1989.

Charalambopoulos died on October 16, 2014, at the age of 95.

References

1919 births
2014 deaths
Foreign ministers of Greece
Deputy Prime Ministers of Greece
Ministers of National Defence of Greece
Hellenic Army officers
Greek colonels
Centre Union politicians
PASOK MEPs
MEPs for Greece 1981–1984
Greek military personnel of World War II
Resistance to the Greek junta
Greek MPs 1963–1964
Greek MPs 1964–1967
Greek MPs 1974–1977
Greek MPs 1977–1981
Greek MPs 1981–1985
Greek MPs 1985–1989
Greek MPs 1989 (June–November)
Greek MPs 1989–1990
Greek MPs 1990–1993
Greek MPs 1993–1996
Greek MPs 1996–2000
Greek MPs 2000–2004
Members of the Panhellenic Liberation Movement
People from Messenia